The cinepanettoni (singular: cinepanettone) are a series of farcical comedy films, one or two of which are scheduled for release annually in Italy during the Christmas period. The films were originally produced by Aurelio De Laurentiis' Filmauro studio.

Etymology 
Starting in 1983, some farcical or comic movie were released every year around Christmas time in Italy, and were known as cinepanettoni, a Portmanteau of Italian: cine for "Cinema", and panettone is a type of sweet bread traditionally eaten at Christmas.

The saga of cinepanettoni 
These films are usually focused on the holidays of stereotypical Italians: bungling, wealthy and presumptuous members of the middle class who visit famous, glamorous or exotic places. Films were set for example in the Netherlands (Merry Christmas, 2001), Egypt (Christmas in Egypt – Natale sul Nilo, 2002), India (Christmas in India – Natale in India, 2003), America (Christmas in Miami, 2005, or Christmas in New York, 2006), Cortina d'Ampezzo (Christmas holidays in Cortina – Vacanze di Natale a Cortina, 2011). Directors included Carlo Vanzina, Enrico Oldoini, and Neri Parenti.

Many of the screenplays are not related to Christmas, other than those set in Italy.

The protagonists (almost always Massimo Boldi and Christian De Sica) joined by other comic couples (Sabrina Ferilli, Ricky Memphis, Biagio Izzo, Alberto Sordi, Claudio Bisio, Alessandro Gassman, Michelle Hunziker, Ezio Greggio) and international guests (Danny DeVito, Luke Perry, Ronn Moss) find themselves struggling with their holidays and the various messes that combine abroad. The children of these will often be at the end of the story the only ones to solve complicated situations created by their own fathers, who do nothing but get involved in intrigues with the underworld or love affairs.

Reception 
Italian critics have often considered such films of little ethical or educational value, because they contain large amounts of scurrilous and vulgar phrases and characters providing a bad example of education to young viewers. It often happens in stories that characters played by De Sica and Boldi, mature and elderly people, loom too large on the scene, preventing younger actors from making a mark. Critics have also said that this line of films, including the authors, actors and directors, represented and emphasized the era and the power of Silvio Berlusconi, and the ideals of his supporters.

Despite their critical reception, by 2002, the films had grossed 700 billion lire ($350 million).

Filmography of cinepanettoni 
 Vacanze di Natale ("Christmas Holidays"), directed by Carlo Vanzina (1983) 
 Vacanze di Natale '90 ("Christmas holidays of 1990"), directed by Enrico Oldoini (1990) 
 Vacanze di Natale '91 ("Christmas holidays of 1991"), directed by Enrico Oldoini (1991) 
 Vacanze di Natale '95 ("Christmas holidays of 1995"), directed by Neri Parenti (1995) 
 Vacanze di Natale 2000 ("Christmas holidays of 2000"), directed by Carlo Vanzina (1999 – celebrating the 3rd millennium) 
 Merry Christmas, directed by Neri Parenti (2001) 
 Natale sul Nilo ("Christmas on the Nile"), directed by Neri Parenti (2002) 
 Natale in India ("Christmas in India"), directed by Neri Parenti (2003) 
 Christmas in Love, directed by Neri Parenti (2004) 
 Natale a Miami ("Christmas in Miami"), directed by Neri Parenti (2005) 
 Natale a New York ("Christmas in New York"), directed by Neri Parenti (2006) 
 Natale in crociera ("Christmas on cruise"), directed by Neri Parenti (2007) 
 Natale a Rio ("Christmas in Rio"), directed by Neri Parenti (2008) 
 Natale a Beverly Hills ("Christmas in Beverly Hills"), directed by Neri Parenti (2009) 
 Natale in Sudafrica ("Christmas in South Africa"), directed by Neri Parenti (2010) 
 Vacanze di Natale a Cortina ("Christmas holidays in Cortina"), directed by Neri Parenti (2011) 
 Vacanze ai Caraibi ("Holidays in the Caribbean"), directed by Neri Parenti (2014) 
 In vacanza su Marte ("Holidays on Mars"), directed by Neri Parenti (2020)  Mars

References

Bibliography 
 
 

Lists of Italian films